The Minot Air Defense Sector (MADS) is an inactive United States Air Force organization.  Its last assignment was with the Air Defense Command 29th Air Division,  being stationed at Minot Air Force Base, North Dakota.  It was inactivated on 1 December 1963

History 
Established in April 1959 assuming control of former ADC Western Air Defense Force 27th Air Division units in western North Dakota and eastern Montana.  The organization provided command and control over several aircraft and radar squadrons.

The sector operated a SAGE Air-Defense Control Center (ADCC) (DC-19). A SAGE Direction Center built, and an AN/FSQ-7 direction computers operated the live air picture. The Combat Control Center or CC and its accompanying An/FSQ - 8 computer were never installed or activated.  The SAGE DC was consolidated with the Grand Forks Air Defense Sector on 1 March 1963, and inactivated on 1 December 1963.

Lineage
 Established as Minot Air Defense Sector on 1 April 1959
 Inactivated on 1 December 1963

Assignments 
 29th Air Division, 1 April 1959 – 1 December 1963

Stations 
 Minot AFB, North Dakota, 1 April 1959 – 1 December 1963

Components

Wing
 32d Fighter Wing (Air Defense)
 Minot AFB, North Dakota, 1 February 1961-1 July 1962

Group
 32d Fighter Group (Air Defense)
 Minot AFB, North Dakota, 1 August 1960-1 February 1961

Fighter squadrons
 5th Fighter-Interceptor Squadron
 Minot AFB, North Dakota, 1 July 1962-25 June 1963
 13th Fighter-Interceptor Squadron
 Minot AFB, North Dakota, 1 January 1961-25 June 1963

Radar squadrons

 706th Radar Squadron
 Dickinson AFS, North Dakota, 1 January 1961-25 June 1963
 731st Radar Squadron
 Sundance AFS, Wyoming, 1 January 1961-25 June 1963
 740th Aircraft Control and Warning Squadron
 Ellsworth AFB, South Dakota, 1 January 1961-15 August 1962
 779th Radar Squadron
 Opheim AFS, Montana, 1 January-15 June 1961

 780th Radar Squadron
 Fortuna AFS, North Dakota, 1 January 1961-25 June 1963
 786th Radar Squadron
 Minot AFS, North Dakota, 1 January 1961-25 June 1963
 902d Radar Squadron
 Miles City AFS, Montana, 1 January 1961-25 June 1963

See also
 List of USAF Aerospace Defense Command General Surveillance Radar Stations
 Aerospace Defense Command Fighter Squadrons

References

  A Handbook of Aerospace Defense Organization 1946 - 1980,  by Lloyd H. Cornett and Mildred W. Johnson, Office of History, Aerospace Defense Center, Peterson Air Force Base, Colorado
 Winkler, David F. (1997), Searching the skies: the legacy of the United States Cold War defense radar program. Prepared for United States Air Force Headquarters Air Combat Command.
 Maurer, Maurer (1983). Air Force Combat Units Of World War II. Maxwell AFB, Alabama: Office of Air Force History. .
 Ravenstein, Charles A. (1984). Air Force Combat Wings Lineage and Honors Histories 1947-1977. Maxwell AFB, Alabama: Office of Air Force History. .
 Minot Air Defense Sector

Minot
1959 establishments in North Dakota
1963 disestablishments in North Dakota